eTeacher Group is a private company based in Ramat Gan, Israel, developing and operating online virtual schools, open to students worldwide. It is a portfolio company of Pamoja Capital Group, a private investment firm.

History
eTeacher Group was co-founded in the year 2000 by brothers, Boaz and Yariv Binnun.

In 2002, Israel's Ministry of Foreign Affairs granted the company the challenge of founding the world's first online Hebrew school. Children of employees in the Israeli diplomatic service could use such a service to learn to read, write and speak Hebrew correctly, despite growing up abroad and moving from country to country. A few months later the online platform created by the company started serving Israeli children and families abroad, and then in 2005, an online Hebrew School for the Jewish communities round the world was launched.

In 2008 eTeacher launched Highway to English, an online ESL school, which connects teachers and education professionals from the United States with students from all over the world. The English language program includes five different levels, each with its own curriculum and set of courses.

In  2008 eTeacher launched the Israel Institute of Biblical Studies, providing online courses for Biblical languages and Bible study

Since January 2010, the company has been collaborating with the Hebrew University of Jerusalem in providing courses related to Biblical Studies. These courses are accredited for students of the university, as well as providing language students with academic based courses, supervised by university staff members.

In 2017 the company launched Tekkie Uni, an online school where children learn to program and build games, apps and more. Tekkie Uni offers both synchronous online courses for children to learn coding from home, and a programming curriculum for schools.

In 2020 the company launched Langaroo, Live online English courses for children aged 5–13

The company has since utilized a wide variety of online technology to build and manage large-scale online virtual schools.

Teaching methods
The company provides an online platform for teaching synchronous, live, teacher-led classes, while utilizing a range of tools alongside a team of teachers and scholars.

The teaching process is based on a system which incorporates different teaching tools, the backbone of which is a weekly live lesson with a language teacher (usually native to the language he or she teaches in). The company employs some 300 teachers from around the world.

Alongside the weekly "real-time" lessons the courses include a weekly practice lesson. In order to supplement these online weekly meetings, the courses also provide recorded dialogues and recorded lessons. Also, supplementing the electronic and online aspects of the programs, the student my also make use of provided teaching textbooks and workbooks in the language and level the course is focused on. Between lessons the student is expected to complete assignments and homework, which are in turn graded by the staff.

Virtual schools
The different courses are divided into five schools, each with a staff of teachers, learning platforms and a website. Each of these schools offers courses at different levels and localization.

TekkieUni - Coding for Kids 
The program is designed for children in elementary school, junior high, and high school who want to learn how to create and develop software and games for iOS, Android, and computers.

Langaroo - English for Kids 
Langaroo offers children aged 5 to 13 private online lessons with certified English teachers.

Highway To English 
Live online English courses and tutoring with teachers from the USA

The Israel Institute of Biblical Studies
Launched in 2007, the Biblical languages school teaches courses in Biblical Hebrew, Aramaic and Biblical Greek. Since 2010, the Biblical school also offers academically credited courses for Hebrew University of Jerusalem students. The courses in this school are supervised by academic staff from the university.

Chinese Voice
The Chinese School offers courses in Chinese, in up to five levels of difficulty.

The Rosen School of Hebrew
The Hebrew school was the first to be launched, and is probably the most wide spread. It offers courses in Hebrew for adults and for children, alongside seminars for Hebrew language students.

External links 

 TekkieUni.com
 Langaroo
 Highway to English
 Israel Institute of Biblical Studies
 Rosen School of Hebrew

Education companies of Israel
Language schools
Education companies established in 2000
Hebrew University of Jerusalem
Companies based in Ramat Gan